Henri-Georges Clouzot's Inferno (French title: L'Enfer d'Henri-Georges Clouzot) is a film directed, written and produced by Henri-Georges Clouzot, cinematography by Andréas Winding and Armand Thirard, which remained unfinished in 1964. It was presented in 2009 as a full-length semi-documentary by Serge Bromberg.

History
The film depicts the extreme jealousy of a hotelier, Marcel (Serge Reggiani, then 42 years old), towards his wife, Odette (Romy Schneider, then 26 years old). It was shot partly in black-and-white, partly in colour. Clouzot selected the title as an allusion to Dante's Inferno, and the names Odette and Marcel refer to characters in Marcel Proust's novel À la recherche du temps perdu.

Despite an unlimited budget from Columbia Pictures—Clouzot worked with three crews and 150 technicians—the shooting was beset by severe problems: everyone suffered from the record heat during July in the Cantal region; the main actor Serge Reggiani claimed to be ill (Jean-Louis Trintignant was asked to replace him); the artificial lake below the Garabit viaduct, an important part of the location, was about to be emptied by the local authorities; then Clouzot suffered a heart attack and was hospitalised in Saint-Flour. After three weeks, the film was abandoned.

Cast

Romy Schneider, Odette
Serge Reggiani, Marcel
Dany Carrel, Marylou
Jean-Claude Bercq, Martineau
Catherine Allégret, Yvette
Blanchette Brunoy, Clotilde
Mario David, Julien

Other versions
In 1994, Claude Chabrol used the screenplay by Clouzot to make his film L'Enfer.

In 2009, Serge Bromberg and Ruxandra Medrea released a 94 minute documentary with material selected from 15 hours (185 reels) of found scenes under the name L'Enfer d'Henri-Georges Clouzot. Bromberg was caught for two hours in a stalled elevator with a woman who turned out to be Clouzot's second wife, Inès de Gonzalez. Upon learning the identity of the woman and of the existence of the footage, Bromberg convinced her to release it to make his film. The documentary includes interviews with nine cast and crew members, notably Catherine Allégret, the production assistant from 1964, Costa Gavras, and the assistant cinematographer William Lubtchansky. Bromberg used the actors Bérénice Bejo and Jacques Gamblin to shoot some scenes where dialogue had to be delivered; the found material, which included some 30 hours of soundtrack, didn't contain suitable material.

The film was shown out-of-competition at the 2009 Cannes Film Festival, at the 2009 Toronto International Film Festival, and film festivals in New York, Vancouver, London and Rotterdam; it was nationally released in France on 11 November 2009. In 2010 it received the César Award for Best Documentary.

Visual effects
The film features several innovative and practical lighting techniques by Andréas Winding and Armand Thirard. Most notably in the psychedelic climax of the film, rotating lighting rigs were placed in-front of the camera and actors. The final effect created the illusion of the actors faces transitioning between emotions, and personalities. They would also slowly change their emotions intensifying the effect when synced to each rotation.

References

External links

L'Enfer d'Henri-Georges Clouzot, 2009 Toronto International Film Festival
13 stills, 20 minutes'' 
"L’enfer, selon Clouzot" by Elisabeth Bouvet, Radio France Internationale (19 May 2009) 
"A superb documentary about a notorious film that floundered in the mid-1960s." by Lisa Nesselson, SBS TV (19 May 2009)
 (1:40)

Films directed by Henri-Georges Clouzot
1960s unfinished films
1964 films
French documentary films
Documentary films about films
2009 films
1960s French films
2000s French films